Las Píldoras is a 1972 Argentine film. It is an Argentinian comedian movie written by Oscar Viale (under the pseudonym V. Rosid and adapted to the big screen by Isaac Aisemberg. It is based in the theatrical piece where the actors and actresses of the movie also represented.

Cast
Susana Brunetti
Dario Vittori
Santiago Bal
Tincho Zabala
Vanessa Show

External links
 

1972 films
Argentine musical comedy films
1970s Spanish-language films
Films directed by Enrique Cahen Salaberry
1970s Argentine films